WMTK (106.3 MHz 106.3 The Notch) is a classic rock formatted station located in northern New Hampshire.  It is licensed to Littleton, and is owned by the Vermont Broadcast Associates, Inc., along with WSTJ, WKXH, and WGMT.  Programming is also simulcast on 1490/103.1 WIKE in Newport, Vermont.  Both stations call themselves "The Notch."

History

On August 1, 1985, WMTK became the first local commercial FM station to sign on in the North Country of New Hampshire and Northeast Kingdom of Vermont. The station began with a country music format, a local morning show, with local news and weather inserted throughout the day. The satellite country music service came from the Transtar Radio Networks, now Westwood One.

WMTK was never owned with Littleton's first radio station, AM 1400 WLTN, so Littleton had two stand-alone radio stations at the time. WMTK was known initially as "K 106.3", though over time became known as 106.3 WMTK. The studios were located at historic Thayer's Inn on Main Street.

For years, WMTK used to compete with both advertisers and listeners with St. Johnsbury's WNKV 105.5 FM (now Kix 105.5 WKXH). When WMTK and WNKV came under common ownership (VBA), WMTK was flipped to a broad-based classic rock/classic hits variant that is still being programmed today. While still transmitting from Mann's Hill in Littleton, the studios were consolidated in the VBA broadcast building co-located with the WKXH and WSTJ studios on Concord Avenue in St. Johnsbury when Thayer's Inn needed the studio space for hotel purposes.

References

External links

MTK
Classic rock radio stations in the United States
Radio stations established in 1985
1985 establishments in New Hampshire
Littleton, New Hampshire